The Manasir people constitute one of many Sunni Arab riverine tribes of Northern Sudan. They are not to be confused with the Manasir of the Persian Gulf region in the Arabian Peninsula-based mainly in the United Arab Emirates.  They inhabit the region of the Fourth Cataract of the Nile and call their homeland Dar al-Manasir. Similar to their neighbouring tribes, the upstream Rubatab (الرباطاب) and the downstream Shaiqiyah (الشايقيّة), the Manasir are an indigenous Nile culture who adopted Islam and became Arabic speakers. Unlike other riverine tribes of the Sudan, a considerable part of their population lives as Bedouins in the adjacent Bayudah Desert. The nomadic life of herding their stock of goats, sheep and camels in desert valleys is however limited for many to the rainy season, coinciding with the annual inundation of the Nile.

Origin
Similar to other Arab tribes, the people trace their origins back to one historical ancestor. According to the current oral tradition of many Manasir, this person is called Mansur and belongs to the line of descendants of al-'Abbas, the uncle of Muhammad.
According to their self-presentation in a publication by a committee of Manasir responsible for relocation issues resulting from the Merowe Dam, which is going to affect all villages of Dar al-Manasir, multiple explanations of their origin are offered (LAGNAH 2005:2):
 The Manasir living in Gezira claim that their apical forefather is called Mansur bin Qahtan (منصور بن قحطان), belonging to the Southern Arabs called Qahtaniin (القحطانيين).
 Some historians (sources not mentioned) trace the origin of the Manasir back to the Kawahla (الكواهلة), saying that they are sons of Mansur bin 'Aim (منصور بن عايم).
 Other historians (sources not mentioned) insist that they are the descendants of a group of cousins from a Shaiqi clan called al-Hankab (الحنكاب), who had to migrate after internal fights. According to the last opinion Mansur is a direct descendant of King Sabir (الملك صبير).

Earlier travellers witnessed Beja and Bisharin influences from the Red Sea Hills among the Manasir (INNES 1931:187).
Strong similarities of their burial customs with that of the Nubians can still be observed (cf. CAVENDISH 1966, Local beliefs among the Manasir).

Critical research suggests that the current Manasir community should be viewed as a voluntary amalgamation throughout the centuries between indigenous mostly Nubian groups, descendants of emigrating Arabs and recruited tribal minorities living among them or in the adjoining areas. By recognizing a common genealogical pedigree, all members of the tribe establish a system of mutual respect, rights and obligations, thereby uniting themselves in their claims for land and other resources against neighbouring tribes.
Varying detailed charts of their genealogy can be studied in SALIH (1999:20) and TAIYEB (1969:between 4-5).

The current Manasir clans are divided into Riverain Manasir (Manasir al-Nil, مناصير النيل) and Bedouin Manasir (Manasir al-Badiyah, مناصير البادية), (cf. TAIYEB 1969:2).
 Manasir al-Nil: al-Wahabab (الوهاب), al-Suleimaniyah (السليمانية), al-Kabanah (الكبانة), al-Diqeisab (الدقيساب), al-Hamsab (الهامزاب), al-Ga'al (الجعل), al-'Ababsah (العبابسة), al-Farei'ab (الفريعاب) [Rubatab], al-Hamdatiab (الحمدتياب) [Shaiqi] and al-'Amasib (العماسيب).
 Manasir al-Badiyah: sharing the grazing grounds of Abisba' (ابسباع) and Sani (سانى) are al-Khabra (الخبرا), al-Hamamir (الحمامير), al-Muleikab (المليكاب) and al-Kagbab (الكجباب).
During the dry season some clans migrate to the desert area of the Kababish tribe to the west (Khala' Kabushiyah, خلاء كبوشية) others to the grazing grounds of Wad Hamid (بادية ود حامد) in the Ga'ali Country (الجعليين) or to the Rubatab (الرباطاب) Country. (cf. LAGNAH 1969:3, TAIYEB 1969:2)

Population 
The de facto population of the Manasir (in the Shiri Rural Council) in 1993 had been 30,000, according to data of The Federal Department of Statistics of Sudan cited and empirically verified by SALIH (1999:10-11). The publication of the Manasir committee is talking about 33,000 residents and 17,000 non-resident Manasir (تعداد السكان المقيمين فى 92/1993 م=33.000 نسمة, تعداد الاسر المترددة فى92/1993 م=17.000 نسمة), (LAGNAH 2005:6).
Both figures remain vague and don't specify to what extent they include the Bedouin Manasir in the Bayudah Desert.

Tribal marks 
Like other tribes in Sudan, most Manasir of the grown-up generations have tribal marks (Shilukh, الشلوخ) which possibly originate from a Sheikh's animal burning mark (Wasm, وسم). The tribal marks are cut with a razor on the cheeks of a child to mark it belonging to a specific tribe. Among the Donqolawi and the Shaiqiya these marks usually consist of three horizontal scars, among the Rubatab and the Ga'aliin the lines are vertical, the scars in the case of the Rubatab being rather larger and closer together (cf. CROWFOOT 131–132). The Manasir do not have a unique design of tribal marks, but copy either the upstream or downstream neighbouring tribes.

Economy and culture 

The riverain Manasir pursue small scale agriculture on alluvial soils in the immediate vicinity of the Nile. Their most important cash crop sold on the national market is a wide variety of dates (cf. Date Cultivation in Dar al-Manasir). They are also renowned for their skill in building mud houses (Galus, جالوص) and they used to float wood from the region of Atbarah (cf. TAIYEB 1969:3, SALIH 1999:152).

Their material culture is simple and consists mainly of a variety of storage containers and tools (cf. Material Culture of the Manasir). An insight into their culture and perception can be obtained by studying the Diwan of their recent poet Ibrahim 'Ali Salman.

References 
 Cavendish, M. W. (1966): "The Custom of Placing Pebbles on Nubian Graves". In: Sudan Notes and Records, Vol.47, pp. 151–156.
 Crowfoot, J. W. (1918): "Customs of the Rubatab". In: Sudan Notes and Records, Vol.1, pp. 119–134.
 Innes, N. McL. (1930): "The Monasir Country". In: Sudan Notes and Records, Vol.14, pp. 185–191.
 Lagnah al-Tanfidhiyah lil-Muta'thirin (2005): Khasan al-Hamdab wa Qissah Tahgir Ahali al-Manasir. 20 p. (اللجنة التنفيذية للمتأثرين (2005): خزان الحامداب و قصة تهجير أهالي المناصير)
 Qasim, 'A. al-Sh. (2002): Qamus al-Lahgah al-'Amiya fi al-Sudan. 3rd ed. 1076 p. (عون الشريف قاسم (2002): قاموس اللهجة العامية في السودان. الطبعة الثالثة. الدار السودانية للكتب)
 Salih, A. M. (1999): The Manasir of the Northern Sudan: Land and People. A Riverain Society and Resource Scarcity. 282 p.
 Taiyeb, M. al-T. et al. (1969): Al-Turath al-Sha'ibi li-Qabilah al-Manasir. Salsalah Dirasat fi al-Turath al-Sudani. Khartoum University Faculty of Adab. 155 p. (الطيب محمد الطيب و عبد السلام سليمان و علي سعد (1969): التراث الشعبي لقبيلة المناصير. سلسلة دراسات في التراث السوداني, جامعة الخرطوم, كلية الآداب )

External links 

 Homepage of the Humboldt University Nubian Expedition (H.U.N.E.)

Arabs in Sudan
Ethnic groups in Sudan